Stefaniak is a Polish surname. It may refer to:
 Bill Stefaniak, Australian politician
 Józef Stefaniak, Polish ice hockey player
 Krzysztof Stefaniak, Polish sports shooter
 Marvin Stefaniak, German footballer
 Mary Helen Stefaniak, American writer

Polish-language surnames